Aydoğdu is a village in the Erzincan District of Erzincan Province in Turkey. It had a population of 350 in 2021.

References

Villages in Erzincan District